Hari Balakrishnan is the Fujitsu Professor of Computer Science and Artificial Intelligence in the Department of Electrical Engineering and Computer Science at MIT, and the Co-founder and CTO at Cambridge Mobile Telematics.

Early life and career 
Balakrishnan was born in Nagpur, India, and was raised in Bombay (Mumbai) and Chennai.  He received his bachelor's degree in computer science from the Indian Institute of Technology, Madras in 1993 and his doctoral degree in computer science from the University of California, Berkeley in 1998. He has been at MIT since 1998. His father, V. Balakrishnan, is a renowned physics educator and researcher in theoretical physics, his mother, Radha Balakrishnan, is also a well-known theoretical physicist, and his sister, Hamsa Balakrishnan, is a Professor and Associate Department Head of MIT's Department of Aeronautics and Astronautics.

Computer networks and congestion control 
Balakrishnan co-invented the Chord distributed hash table, the RON resilient overlay network (with David Andersen), and the rcc tool for verifiable Internet routing (with Nick Feamster). His contributions to Internet congestion control architecture include the Congestion Manager to share congestion information across flows, the Congestion Control Plane to write sophisticated algorithms at user level but run at hardware speeds, and the Fastpass system (with Jonathan Perry) for nearly zero-queue data transport in datacenters. His congestion control algorithms include binomial congestion control with Deepak Bansal (this method is now a component in Microsoft's Compound TCP), the Remy computer-synthesized congestion controller with Keith Winstein, the Sprout method for cellular networks (also with Winstein), Copa (with Venkat Arun), and the ABC scheme for cellular networks (with Prateesh Goyal, Ravi Netravali, and Mohammad Alizadeh).

Mobile sensing 
The CarTel project (2005-2010) of Hari Balakrishnan and Sam Madden introduced the idea of using sensors attached to mobile assets such as vehicles and user's phones to measure the environment, helping to create the field of mobile sensing. Results from the CarTel project include the Pothole Patrol (with Jakob Eriksson and others), which used the opportunistic mobility of sensor-equipped vehicles to detect the surface conditions of roads, and the VTrack and CTrack algorithms for accurate path and delay inference from noisy position streams. The project also developed new ways to compute aggregate statistics over location data while preserving location privacy. The company they co-founded from the CarTel project, Cambridge Mobile Telematics (CMT), is today the world's largest mobile telematics provider supporting many leading insurance and rideshare companies in 25 countries, helping to reduce the millions of road crashes that occur annually. The SenSys 2006 paper on CarTel received the ACM SIGMOBILE "Test of Time" award in 2018, while the 2009 paper on VTrack received the ACM SenSys "Test of Time" award in 2019.

Cricket 
Between 1999 and 2004, his work on the Cricket indoor location system (with Nissanka Priyantha) showed how to combine radio and ultrasound for precise (3–5 cm) indoor location. Cricket was licensed to several companies and several hundreds of thousands of Cricket devices were built and used in projects and products in 16 countries. The MobiCom 2000 paper on the Cricket system won the ACM SIGMOBILE "Test of Time" award in 2017.

Wireless networks 
Balakrishnan's work on wireless networks cuts across the different layers of the protocol stack. His papers in the 1990s were among the first to develop a deep understanding of, and ways to improve, TCP's performance on wireless networks, for which he won the ACM doctoral dissertation award in 1998. His work on wireless networks includes the TCP Migrate protocol (with Alex Snoeren) for seamless TCP connection migration across IP addresses. His work on spinal codes with Jonathan Perry and Devavrat Shah developed the first rateless codes to nearly achieve Shannon capacity over both Gaussian and binary-symmetric channels with an efficient encoder and decoder, thereby providing a new way to combat time-varying wireless channels. His work with Kyle Jamieson on SoftPHY systematically exploited demodulation confidence to improve bit rate adaptation, contention management, and parsimonious retransmissions for partial packet recovery, and his papers on sensor network protocols such as LEACH (with Wendi Heinzelman and Anantha Chandrakasan) and Spin were the first to consider overall system longevity as an important design goal, and have been cited many thousands of times by subsequent papers.

Internet security 
Balakrishnan's work on Internet security includes the Infranet anti-censorship system, distributed quota enforcement for spam control, the Accountable Internet Protocol (AIP), and guarding against application-level distributed denial-of-service attacks using proof of "network work". His work on router design includes the development of switch scheduling and QoS algorithms for Sandburst's (acquired by Broadcom) switch in the early 2000s, and his research on programmable high-speed routers (Domino and PIFO) with Anirudh Sivaraman, Mohammad Alizadeh, and others, which have influenced the P4 forwarding language. His work on naming systems includes an early empirical study of DNS performance and caching effectiveness and the proposal for a layered naming architecture for the Internet using flat names resolvable using a scalable distributed hash table at the lowest layer.

Database systems 
With Magdalena Balazinska and others, Balakrishnan developed methods for distributed load balancing and fault-tolerance in stream processing systems (Borealis project); this work received the ACM SIGMOD "Test of Time" award in 2017. With Raluca Ada Popa and Nickolai Zeldovich, he helped develop CryptDB, a system for performing SQL queries over encrypted data.

Awards and honors 
1998: His PhD thesis on reliable data transport over wireless networks won the ACM doctoral dissertation award for best thesis in computer science. 

2002: He was elected as a Fellow of the Sloan Foundation.

2003: He received MIT's prestigious Harold E. Edgerton prize for research and teaching excellence. 

2008: He was elected a fellow of the Association for Computing Machinery (ACM) in 2008.

2013: He received the Distinguished Alumnus Award from the Indian Institute of Technology, Madras.

2015: He was elected to the US National Academy of Engineering for contributions to networks and distributed systems.

2017: He was elected to the American Academy of Arts and Sciences. 

2020: He was elected as a Fellow of the IEEE.

2020: He received the Infosys Prize for Engineering and Computer Science, the most prestigious award that recognizes achievements in science and research in India, for his broad contributions to computer networking, his seminal work on mobile and wireless systems, and for commercial use of mobile telematics to improve driver behavior and make roads safer around the world.

2021: He received the IEEE Koji Kobayashi Computers and Communications Award for broad contributions to computer networking and mobile and wireless systems. 

2021: He received the Distinguished Alumnus Award in Computer Science from the EECS Department of the University of California at Berkeley. 

2023. Marconi Prize awarded by the Marconi Society. 

He has also received several best paper awards including the 2004 IEEE William R. Bennett Prize, and six "test of time" awards for papers with long-term impact.

Industry 
In 2010, Balakrishnan founded Cambridge Mobile Telematics with Bill Powers and Sam Madden, and serves as the Chairman of its board. In December 2018, the SoftBank Vision Fund invested $500 million in Cambridge Mobile Telematics. He is also an advisor to several companies including YugabyteDB, Flowmill (acquired by Splunk), Valtix, Perch, Walrus Security, and StreamAlive. He was a founding advisor to Meraki Networks in 2006 until its acquisition in 2012. In 2003, he co-founded StreamBase Systems, commercializing academic research with Mike Stonebraker and others. He served on the Scientific Council of IMDEA Networks between 2007 and 2014.

References

External links 
 
 
 
 Author profile in the database zbMATH

MIT School of Engineering faculty
IIT Madras alumni
UC Berkeley College of Engineering alumni
Fellows of the Association for Computing Machinery
Living people
Fellows of the American Academy of Arts and Sciences
1971 births